The Drug Trafficking Offences Act 1986 was the first act of the Parliament of the United Kingdom  specifically dealing with laundering the proceeds of drug trafficking. The legislation was enacted as a direct response to the failure of the courts' power making it impossible under the law, as it stood, to confiscate some £750,000 of drug trafficking proceeds which were traced directly to the offenders convicted in consequence of Operation Julie.

It was largely repealed and replaced by the Drug Trafficking Act 1994.

External links

United Kingdom Acts of Parliament 1986